Gil Kola or Gil Kala or Gilkala may refer to:
 Gil Kola, Chalus
 Gil Kola, Nowshahr